The Nineteenth Amendment of the Constitution of India, officially known as The Constitution (Nineteenth Amendment) Act, 1966, abolished Election Tribunals in India and enabled trial of election petitions by High Courts. It amended clause (1) of article 324 of the Constitution, which provides for vesting of the power of superintendence, direction and control of elections with the Election Commission. The 19th Amendment removed the provision relating to the power of "the appointment of election tribunals for the decision of doubts and disputes arising out of or in connection with elections to Parliament and to the Legislatures of States".

Provisions for the trial of election petitions by High Courts instead of the election tribunals, was provided for by amending the Representation of the People Act, 1951.

Text

The full text of clause (1) of article 324, after the 19th Amendment, is given below:

Proposal and enactment
The Constitution (Nineteenth Amendment) Act, 1966 was introduced in the Lok Sabha on 29 August 1966, as the Constitution (Twenty-first Amendment) Bill, 1966 (Bill No. 57 of 1966). It was introduced by Gopal Swarup Pathak, then Minister of Law, and sought to amend article 324 of the Constitution. Article 324 provides for vesting of the power of superintendence, direction and control of elections with the Election Commission. The full text of the Statement of Objects and Reasons appended to the bill is given below:

The Bill was debated by the Lok Sabha on 8, 9, 10 and 22 November and passed on 22 November 1966, with only a formal amendment in clause 1, changing the short title to "Constitution (Nineteenth Amendment) Act". The bill, passed by the Lok Sabha, was considered and passed by the Rajya Sabha on 30 November 1966. Clause 2 was adopted in the original form by the Lok Sabha and Rajya Sabha on 22 and 30 November 1966, respectively. The bill received assent from then President Zakir Hussain on 11 December 1966. It came into force and was notified in The Gazette of India on the same date.

See also
List of amendments of the Constitution of India

References

19
1966 in India
1966 in law
Election law in India
Indira Gandhi administration